Bacillus mycoides is a bacterium of the genus Bacillus. Like other Bacillus species, B. mycoides is Gram positive, rod-shaped, and forms spores. B. mycoides is distinguished from other Bacillus species by its unusual growth on agar plates, where it forms expansive hairy colonies with characteristic swirls.

Description
B. mycoides are rod-shaped cells about 1 micron across and 3 to 5 microns long. When growing, they either grow as single cells or form loosely connected chains of cells. They are not motile. B. mycoides can survive with or without oxygen and grows at temperatures ranging from 10 to 15 °C to 35–40 °C. B. mycoides is distinguished from a number of other Bacillus species in the unusual morphology of the colonies it forms when grown on agar plates. B. mycoides forms white opaque colonies that are characteristically hairy in appearance (often referred to as "rhizoid"). These colonies rapidly spread to fill the plate and are characterized by a repeating spiral pattern. B. mycoides has the unusual property of being able to respond to mechanical force and surface structure variations in the media on which it is growing.

Ecology and distribution
B. mycoides is present in a wide variety of environments, especially soil.

Role in disease
B. mycoides are capable of causing disease in some fish, and were the reported cause of an outbreak of necrotic lesions in channel catfish in a commercial pond in Alabama.

B. weihenstephanensis
In 1998 a new Bacillis species was described, and named Bacillus weihenstephanensis. However, twenty years later, a comparison of the complete genome sequences of B. weihenstephanensis and B. mycoides demonstrated that B. weihenstephanensis was a later synonym for B. mycoides, and thus not a valid species, nor species name.

References

Further reading

External links
Type strain of Bacillus mycoides at BacDive -  the Bacterial Diversity Metadatabase

mycoides